Stephen Gallagher (born 13 October 1954) is an English screenwriter and novelist. Gallagher was born in Salford, Greater Manchester.

Career
Gallagher has written novels and television scripts, including for the BBC television series Doctor Who — for which he wrote two serials, Warriors' Gate (1981) and Terminus (1983)—as well as for the series Rosemary & Thyme and Bugs, for two seasons of which he was script consultant along with Brian Clemens. He adapted his own novel Chimera as a 90 minute dramatized audio drama for BBC Radio 4 in 1985, and as a miniseries of the same name that was shown on ITV in 1991.  He also directed the miniseries adaptation of Oktober, as well as writing the feature-length episode The Kingdom of Bones for the BBC series Murder Rooms.

He created and wrote a science-based series for ITV, Eleventh Hour, starring Patrick Stewart as a government science investigator and advisor. The programme was rumoured to be ITV's answer to the new series of Doctor Who, but was more in the tradition of the hard-science thriller. Gallagher's series format was acquired for a US television remake by the CSI trio of CBS, Jerry Bruckheimer and director Danny Cannon. The series aired on CBS and starred Rufus Sewell and Marley Shelton.

Life Line, broadcast in 2007, was a two-part supernatural mystery starring Ray Stevenson, Joanne Whalley and Jemima Rooper. Gallagher was later lead writer and story supervisor on NBC's 13-part series Crusoe, screened in 2008/2009, and contributed two episodes to the US version of Eleventh Hour including Medea, the season finale. In 2009 he served as Co-Executive Producer on Bruckheimer's crime show The Forgotten, starring Christian Slater. Legacy, a two-part story for season 16 of the BBC's Silent Witness, was Best Drama winner in the 2013 European Science TV and New Media Awards. He later wrote episodes of Stan Lee's Lucky Man.

Bibliography

Novels
The Last Rose of Summer – 1978 (later revised as Dying of Paradise)
Saturn Three – 1980 (film novelisation)
Silver Dream Racer – 1980 (film novelisation, as John Lydecker)
Chimera (British TV series) – 1982
Doctor Who: Warriors' Gate – 1982 (as John Lydecker)
Dying of Paradise – 1982 (as Stephen Couper)
Doctor Who: Terminus – 1983 (as John Lydecker)
The Ice Belt – 1983 (as Stephen Couper)
The Kids from Fame – 1983 (as Lisa Todd)
The Kids from Fame II – 1983 (as Lisa Todd)
Follower – 1984
Valley of Lights – 1987
Oktober (TV series) – 1988
Down River – 1989
Rain – 1990
The Boat House – 1991
Nightmare, With Angel – 1992
Red, Red Robin – 1995
White Bizango – 2002
The Spirit Box – 2005
The Painted Bride – 2006
The Kingdom of Bones – 2007
The Bedlam Detective – 2012
The Authentic William James – 2016
Dying of Paradise: The Trilogy – 2022 (includes previously unpublished novel The Babylon Run)

Non-fiction
Journeyman: The Art of Chris Moore – 2000

Screenplays
Trick Shot – 1980 (short film)
Doctor Who: Warriors’ Gate - 1981 (BBC)Doctor Who: Terminus (Doctor Who) – 1983 (BBC)Rockliffe's Folly: Moving Targets – 1988 (BBC)Chimera (British TV series) – 1991 (Zenith/Anglia)Chiller (TV series): Prophecy – 1995 (YTV)Chiller (TV series): Here Comes the Mirror Man – 1995 (YTV)Bugs (TV series): Assassins, Inc – 1995 (Carnival Films/BBC)Bugs (TV series): Down Among the Dead Men – 1995 (Carnival Films/BBC)Bugs (TV series): Stealth – 1995 (Carnival Films/BBC)Bugs (TV series): Pulse – 1995 (Carnival Films/BBC)Bugs (TV series): Schrodinger’s Bomb – 1996 (Carnival Films/BBC)Bugs (TV series): The Bureau of Weapons – 1996 (Carnival Films/BBC)Bugs (TV series): A Cage for Satan – 1996 (Carnival Films/BBC)Bugs (TV series): Blaze of Glory – 1997 (Carnival Films/BBC)Bugs (TV series): The Revenge Effect – 1997 (Carnival Films/BBC)Bugs (TV series): Renegades – 1997 (Carnival Films/BBC)Oktober (TV series) – 1998 (Carnival Films/ITV)Murder Rooms: Mysteries of the Real Sherlock Holmes: The Kingdom of Bones (TV Movie) –  2001 (BBC Films)Rosemary & Thyme: The Memory of Water –  2004 (Carnival Films)Rosemary & Thyme: The Cup of Silence –  2005 (Carnival Films)Eleventh Hour (British TV series): Resurrection – 1983 (Granada TV)Eleventh Hour (British TV series): Containment – 1987 (Granada TV)Life Line (TV movie) – 2007 (Carnival Films)Crusoe (TV series): Rum – 2008 (NBC/Power TV)Crusoe (TV series): Gunpowder – 2008 (NBC/Power TV)Crusoe (TV series): Sacrifice – 2008 (NBC/Power TV) (uncredited)Crusoe (TV series): The Traveler – 2009 (NBC/Power TV)Crusoe (TV series): The Return – 2009 (NBC/Power TV)Eleventh Hour (American TV series): Resurrection – 2008 (CBS/Bruckheimer TV) (story by)Eleventh Hour (American TV series): Containment – 2008 (CBS/Bruckheimer TV) (story by)Eleventh Hour (American TV series): Subway – 2009 (CBS/Bruckheimer TV)Eleventh Hour (American TV series): Medea – 2009 (CBS/Bruckheimer TV)The Forgotten (TV series): Canine John – 2010 (CBS/Bruckheimer TV)The Forgotten (TV series): Patient John – 2010 (CBS/Bruckheimer TV)Silent Witness: Legacy, Part 1 – 2013 (BBC)Silent Witness: Legacy, Part 2 – 2013 (BBC)Stan Lee's Lucky Man: Charm Offensive – 2016 (Carnival Films/POW! Entertainment/Sky)

Radio and AudioThe Last Rose of Summer – 1977 (6x30’, Piccadilly Radio)Hunters’ Moon – 1978 (8x30, Piccadilly Radio)The Humane Solution – 1979 (90’, BBC Radio 4 Saturday Night Theatre)The Babylon Run – 1979 (4x30, Piccadilly Radio)An Alternative to Suicide – 1979 (90’, BBC Radio 4 Saturday Night Theatre)A Resistance to Pressure – 1980 (90’, BBC Radio 4 Saturday Night Theatre)Chimera – 1985 (90’, BBC Radio 4 Saturday Night Theatre)The Kingston File – 1987 (90’, BBC Radio 4 Saturday Night Theatre)The Wonderful Visit – 1988 (45’, H. G. Wells adaptation, BBC Radio 4 Afternoon Theatre)By the River, Fontainebleau – 1988 (30’, BBC Radio 4 Fear on Four)The Horn – 1989 (30’, BBC Radio 4 Fear on Four)The Visitors’ Book – 1992 (short story,BBC Radio 4, reader Terence Edmond)Life Line – 1993 (30’, BBC Radio 4, Fear on Four)The Bedlam Detective – 2012 (Audiobook, Dreamscape Media, reader Michael Page)The Kingdom of Bones – 2013 (Audiobook, Oakhill Publishing, reader Jonathan Keeble)The Box – 2013 (30’, Hammer Chillers, Bafflegab Productions)The Bedlam Detective – 2014 (Audiobook, Oakhill Publishing, reader Jonathan Keeble)Nightmare Country – 2019 (Doctor Who: The Lost Stories, Big Finish Productions)Warriors’ Gate – 2019 (Audiobook, BBC Audio, reader Jon Culshaw)Casting the Runes – 2019 (M. R. James adaptation, Bafflegab Productions)Terminus – 2019 (Audiobook, BBC Audio, reader Steven Pacey)The Kairos Ring – 2021 (Audio original, BBC Audio, reader Steven Pacey)

TheatreCheeky Boy – March 2018 (portmanteau drama The Ghost Train Doesn't Stop Here Any More, Tristan Bates Theatre, London)

 Short fiction 
CollectionsOut of His Mind – 2004 (collection of short stories, winner of the British Fantasy Award)Plots and Misadventures – 2007 (second collection of short stories)Comparative Anatomy: the Best of Stephen Gallagher'' – 2022 (Subterranean Press)

Stories

See also
List of horror fiction authors

References

External links

Stephen Gallagher's website
Stephen Gallagher's weblog
New York Times review of The Kingdom of Bones
The Hollywood Reporter: CBS, Bruckheimer Meet in Eleventh Hour
New York Times review of The Bedlam Detective
Kirkus review of The Bedlam Detective
 

1954 births
Living people
20th-century English male writers
20th-century English novelists
21st-century English male writers
21st-century English novelists
British science fiction writers
British television writers
English male novelists
English male screenwriters
English screenwriters
English television writers
The Magazine of Fantasy & Science Fiction people
British male television writers
People from Salford